Bella Bella (Campbell Island) Airport  is located  northwest of Bella Bella on Campbell Island. British Columbia, Canada. The airport is connected by paved road to the village of Bella Bella, and forms a hub of sorts for the Central Coast, with flights linking to Klemtu, Port Hardy, and Vancouver with additional flights during the summer servicing tourist and commercial operations in the area.

Considered a halfway point for small aircraft flying from Seattle, Washington to Alaska, this airport offers a rest and refuel point for many pilots. GPS and NDB approaches are available. Only daylight operations are allowed.

Airlines

See also
Bella Bella/Shearwater Water Aerodrome
Bella Bella/Waglisla Water Aerodrome
Denny Island Aerodrome
 Heiltsuk Nation

References

External links
 Page about this airport on COPA's Places to Fly airport directory

Certified airports in British Columbia
Central Coast Regional District